Valsteeg is a hamlet in the Netherlands and is part of the Coevorden municipality in Drenthe. 

Valsteeg is not a statistical entity, and the postal authority have placed it under Dalen. It was first mentioned in 1650 as Valste, and means "settlement on a slope". It consists of a handful of houses.

References 

Coevorden
Populated places in Drenthe